Victims of the Age is an album by Mark Heard, released in 1982 on Home Sweet Home Records. This album was listed at #32 in the book CCM Presents: The 100 Greatest Albums in Christian Music (Harvest House Publishers, 2001).

"Heart of Hearts" later became a hit on Christian Radio when it was covered by Leslie Phillips.

Track listing
All songs written by Mark Heard.

Side one
 "Victims of the Age" - 3:18
 "City Life Won't Let Up" - 3:43
 "Faces in Cabs" - 3:12
 "Nothing is Bothering Me" - 3:55
 "Some Folks' World" - 4:36

Side two
 "Growing Up Blind" - 4:39
 "Dancing at the Policeman's Ball" - 3:59
 "Everybody Loves a Holy War" - 4:27
 "Heart of Hearts" - 3:08

The band
Mark Heard - electric 6- and 12-string guitars, electric lead and slide guitars, vocals, percussion, harmonica, accordion, mandolin
John Mehler - drums
Bill Batstone - bass guitar
Carl Pickhardt - keyboards
Tom Howard - keyboards
Harry Stinson - tambourine, shaker
Mark Heard, Larry Norman, Leslie Phillips, Bill Batstone.- backing vocals

Production notes
Engineered by Mark Heard, Bill Cobb, Janet Sue Heard
Recorded January–February 1982 at Poiema Studio, Camarillo, California, and at The Gold Mine, Los Angeles, California
Mixed by Mark Heard at Wilder Brothers Studios, West Los Angeles 
Mastered at A&M by Bernie Grundman
Cover design by Mark Heard
Photographs by Janet Sue Heard

"Thanks to Bill and Marsha, John and Linda, Billy, Guy (#8) Denton, Linda at Laursens, Chris and Shanon, Daryl and Dawn, Tom and Dori, Jonathan, and the Benson folks. Love to the Circle of Cynics, Pat and Pam Terry, the Strat Brothers. Chuck and Sandra Perefit, Jon and Diane, Jean and the Screaming Cheese Band in Zurich, the L'Abri folks in Huemoz and Chesieres, Calhoun, Peter and Becky, and my folks."

References

1982 albums
Mark Heard albums